Ge Lake is a freshwater lake in the south of Jiangsu Province, China, northwest of Lake Tai. The lake has a total area of about 146.5 square kilometers. The average depth is 1.19 m, the water storage capacity is about 1.74×108m3.

Notes

Lakes of Jiangsu